No. 199 Squadron was a Royal Air Force aircraft squadron that operated during the Second World War and later in the 1950s as a radar countermeasures squadron.

History
No. 199 Squadron was formed at Rochford on 1 June 1917 with Royal Aircraft Factory BE.2e biplanes to teach pilots advanced bomber training. Renumbered as No. 99 (Depot Training) Squadron RFC the squadron moved to RFCS Harpswell, Lincolnshire in 1918, as a night bomber training unit, where it was disbanded on 13 June 1919.

The squadron reformed at RAF Blyton on 7 November 1942 equipped with the Vickers Wellington, after a few months the squadron moved  to RAF Lakenheath and was re-equipped with the Short Stirling heavy-bomber. Between February 1943 and June 1943 the squadron was based at RAF Ingham in Lincolnshire training for maritime mine laying over The Wash. Following training the squadron returned to RAF Lakenheath for marine operations over the English Channel and North Sea.

In July 1943 the squadron commenced mine laying duties using the Stirling and from February 1944 performed supply drops for the Special Operations Executive. In May 1944 the squadron was moved to No. 100 (Radio Countermeasures) Group with tasking to perform radar jamming operations during the D-Day landings. The squadron aircraft also joined the heavy bomber raids over Germany but was equipped with advanced radar jamming equipment to disrupt the German air defences. In 1945 the Stirlings were exchanged for the Handley Page Halifax until the squadron was disbanded on 29 July 1945 at RAF North Creake.

In 1951 the squadron was formed again at RAF Watton as part of No. 90 Signals Group to operate in the electronic countermeasures role with the Avro Lincoln and de Havilland Mosquito. The Mosquitos were replaced by the English Electric Canberra and the squadron operated with other pathfinder Canberra squadrons at RAF Hemswell. The Lincolns were replaced by the Vickers Valiant in 1957. The squadron was disbanded on 15 December 1958 with the Valiants of C Flight becoming 18 Squadron at RAF Finningley.

Aircraft operated

References

Sources

 

Military units and formations established in 1917
199 Squadron
199 Squadron
1917 establishments in England